Qualification for the 1976 AFC Asian Cup finals held in Iran.

Groups

 * Withdrew
  Iran qualified as host and defending champions
  and  expelled from AFC in 1974

Qualification

Group 1

 All the others withdrew, so  and  qualified automatically.

Group 2
All matches played in Iraq.

 and  qualified for the final tournament.
 eventually withdrew from the competition.

Group 3 
All matches played in Hong Kong.

Group Allocation Matches

Group 3A

Group 3B

Semifinal

Third place match

Final

 and  qualified for the final tournament.
 eventually withdrew from the competition.

Group 4
All matches played in Thailand.

 and  qualified for the final tournament.
 eventually withdrew from the competition.

Qualified teams 

References

"Singapore grouped with Burma in Asian Cup"
The Straits Times, 23 November 1973, Page 29 
"S'pore have an uphill task in Asian Cup tournament"
The Straits Times, 20 December 1974, Page 35

External links
Details at RSSSF

Qual
AFC Asian Cup qualification
Q